The Women's discus throw F42-46 event for amputee athletes was held at the 2004 Summer Paralympics in the Athens Olympic Stadium on 25 September. It was won by Zheng Bao Zhu, representing .

25 Sept. 2004, 09:00

References

W
2004 in women's athletics